The 2005 Vuelta a España was the 60th edition of the Vuelta a España, one of cycling's Grand Tours. The Vuelta began in Granada, with an individual time trial on 27 August, and Stage 12 occurred on 8 September with a stage from Logroño. The race finished in Madrid on 18 September.

Stage 12
8 September 2005 — Logroño to Burgos,

Stage 13

Stage 14
10 September 2005 —  to Lakes of Covadonga,

Stage 15

Stage 16
13 September 2005 — León to Valladolid,

Stage 17
14 September 2005 — El Espinar to La Granja de San Ildefonso,

Stage 18
15 September 2005 — Ávila to Ávila,

Stage 19
16 September 2005 — San Martín de Valdeiglesias to Alcobendas,

Stage 20
17 September 2005 — Guadalajara to Alcalá de Henares,  (ITT)

Stage 21
18 September 2005 — Madrid to Madrid,

References

2005 Vuelta a España
Vuelta a España stages